The Corriente de Renovación Independiente y Solidaridad Laboral (CRISOL) is a trade union in Bolivia. It is affiliated with the International Trade Union Confederation.

International Trade Union Confederation
National trade union centers of Bolivia